Ray McCoy is an Australian broadcaster and country music radio personality from Tamworth, New South Wales. He was a former sports news presenter on Prime7 Newcastle and is currently the morning presenter on 88.9 FM Tamworth, as well as hosting the American Country Music Countdown.

Early life
Ray McCoy was born to Doreen and Killer McCoy and is a triplet. He was raised in Muswellbrook before moving to Penrith and then to Gunnedah but resides in Tamworth, New South Wales.

Career
Ray McCoy has worked at 2LF Cowra, 2NM Muswellbrook, 2TM Tamworth, 2MO Gunnedah, 2KA Penrith, Festival FM Tamworth, 2HH Newcastle, KIX Country and current station 88.9 FM Tamworth.

Ray McCoy also wrote “We'll Never Part” a single by Australian boy band Brothers3.

McCoy is also the President of Group 4 Rugby League in Tamworth.

Related links 
 88.9FM Official website

References

Australian radio personalities
Radio and television announcers
Living people
Year of birth missing (living people)